The Central African mangroves ecoregion consists of the largest area of mangrove swamp in Africa, located on the coasts of West Africa, mainly in Nigeria.

Location and description
These mangroves are found in fertile rivermouths and lagoons and contain trees up to 45m tall. Most are in Nigeria, with important areas Cameroon and Equatorial Guinea/Gabon and patches in Ghana, Democratic Republic of Congo, and northern Angola.  The largest area in the region is on the delta of the Niger River on the Gulf of Guinea, while others include the eastern side of the Cross River delta in Nigeria and Cameroon, the Wouri estuary in Cameroon, and the Muni River estuary on the border of Equatorial Guinea and Gabon, and the mouth of the Congo River. As well as being home to much wildlife the mangroves hold rivers in place, filter the waters and create build-ups of nutrient-rich soil on the banks. Mangroves thrive in humid tropical climates where the sea is warm, and where high tides flood into the rivers. Therefore, there is less on the coast of the Congo, where the Benguela Current brings cool seas, but there are patches here and further south in Angola.

Flora
There are five main species of mangrove trees in the ecoregion: red mangrove (Rhizophora mangle), Rhizophora racemosa, and Rhizophora harrisonii, black mangrove (Avicennia germinans) and white mangrove (Laguncularia racemosa), while the palm Nypa fruticans has been introduced from Asia.

Fauna
The rich communities of oysters, crabs, invertebrates and the great variety of fish sheltering and spawning in the mangroves sustain animal life including monkeys, African manatee (Trichechus senegalensis), and turtles like the African softshell turtle (Trionyx triunguis). Birds include breeding waterbirds such as striated heron and reed cormorant and large flocks of others during migration.

Services related to mangrove
Example of services related mangrove services include regulatory, provisional, cultural and supportive.

Threats and preservation
Nigeria is the most densely populated country in Africa, which puts a strain on the largest remaining areas of these fertile coastal habitats. Much has been cleared for urban and industrial development, such as the oil refineries of the Niger Delta which have also caused the rivers and swamps to become polluted. Urban areas in originally mangrove areas include Lagos in Nigeria and Douala in Cameroon. Other strains on the ecoregion include clearance for salt panning and agriculture.  However mangrove is a resilient habitat and small clumps of mangrove remain in isolation all along the coast of west and central Africa.

19.86% of the Central African mangroves are in protected areas. National protected areas include Douala Edéa National Park in Cameroon, Monte Alén National Park in Equatorial Guinea, Akanda and Pongara national parks in Gabon, and Mangroves National Park in Democratic Republic of the Congo. There are several Ramsar Sites (internationally-designated wetlands of international importance) including Songor and Keta lagoons in Ghana.

External links

References

UNEP (2007). Mangrove of Western and Central Africa. UNEP-Regional Seas Programme/UNEP-WCMC

Afrotropical ecoregions
Ecoregions of Angola
Ecoregions of Cameroon
Ecoregions of the Democratic Republic of the Congo
Ecoregions of Equatorial Guinea
Ecoregions of Gabon
Ecoregions of Ghana
Ecoregions of Nigeria
Mangrove ecoregions